The Vancouver Film Critics Circle Award for Best Documentary Film is an annual award, presented by the Vancouver Film Critics Circle to the film judged by its members as the best international documentary film of the year. It is separate from the Vancouver Film Critics Circle Award for Best Canadian Documentary, presented to Canadian documentary films.

Winners and nominees

2000s

2010s

2020s

References

Vancouver Film Critics Circle Awards
Canadian documentary film awards